Qezel Bolagh, also rendered as Ghezel Bolagh, may refer to:
 Qezel Bolagh, Hashtrud, East Azerbaijan Province
 Qezel Bolagh, Meyaneh, East Azerbaijan Province
 Qezel Bolagh, Bijar, Kurdistan Province
 Qezel Bolagh, Divandarreh, Kurdistan Province
 Qezel Bolagh, West Azerbaijan
 Qezel Bolagh, Zanjan